The black-crested warbler (Myiothlypis nigrocristata) is a species of bird in the family Parulidae.
It is found in Colombia, Ecuador, Peru, and Venezuela.
Its natural habitats are subtropical or tropical moist montane forests and heavily degraded former forest.

References

black-crested warbler
Birds of the Northern Andes
black-crested warbler
Taxonomy articles created by Polbot